Married At First Sight  is an Australian reality television adaptation of the Danish series . The show features a group of strangers who participate in a social experiment and are paired together by experts. The "marriages" depicted on the show are not legally binding under Marriage Act. Rather, contestants engage in an unofficial commitment ceremony. The series first premiered on the 18 May 2015 on the Nine Network. The show has had ten seasons between 2015 and 2023, plus a two-part reunion special which was broadcast before the eighth season in 2021.

Premise
Couples meet for the first time at the altar, before spending their "wedding night" in a hotel and then embarking on a honeymoon. Upon return, they live together for a period of time and each week decide whether they will continue their relationship at a commitment ceremony where they can choose to either stay or leave. The experts encourage contestants to fully immerse themselves within all stages of the experiment which focuses on relationship building and companionship.

Timeline of experts

Season 1 (2015)
In the first episode, two couples (Michael & Roni, Clare & Lachlan) met and wed in Melbourne and Sydney respectively. In the second episode, another two couples (Zoe & Alex, Michelle & James) met and wed in Melbourne and Sydney.

The Nine Network announced on 26 June 2015 that Lachlan would participate in the network's upcoming revival of The Farmer Wants a Wife.

Couple profiles

Season 2 (2016)
In the first episode, two couples (Erin & Bryce, Christie & Mark) meet and wed in Melbourne and Sydney. In the second episode, another two couples (Clare & Jono, Simone & Xavier) met and wed in Melbourne and Sydney respectively.

Couple profiles

Season 3 (2016)
Season 3 was the first to feature five couples, including the series' first same-sex couple. In the first episode, two couples (Nicole & Keller, Monica & Mark) met and wed in Brisbane and Sydney. In the second episode, another two couples (Jess & Dave, Bella & Michael) met and wed in Sydney and Brisbane. In the third episode, one more couple (Craig & Andy) met and wed in New Zealand.

Couple profiles

Season 4 (2017)

In the first episode, two couples (Cheryl & Jonathan, Susan & Sean) met and wed in Sydney and Melbourne. In the second episode, another two couples (Scarlett & Michael, Nadia & Anthony) met and wed in Sydney. In the third episode, two more couples (Alene & Simon, Vanessa & Andy) met and wed in Sydney and Melbourne respectively. In the fourth episode, another two couples (Lauren & Andrew, Deborah & John) met and wed in Sydney. In the fifth episode, two of the women were twins and they were all married in the same ceremony in Perth, (Michelle & Jesse, Sharon & Nick). In the ninth episode two previous contestants were matched up (Andrew & Cheryl).

Season 5 (2018)

In the first episode, the first two couples (Tracey & Dean, Sarah & Telv) met and wed in Sydney and Melbourne. In the second episode, another two couples (Jo & Sean, Alycia & Mat) met and wed in Sydney and Melbourne. In the third episode, two more couples (Davina & Ryan, Charlene & Patrick) met and wed in Warrawong and Melbourne. In the fifth episode, two more couples (Ashley & Troy, Melissa & John (a returning groom from season 4)) met and wed in Gold Coast and Melbourne. In the sixth episode, another two couples (Gabrielle & Nasser, Carly & Justin) met and wed in Sydney. In the seventh episode, the final couple (Blair & Sean) met and wed in Sydney.

Season 6 (2019)

In the first episode, two couples (Jules & Cameron, Cyrell & Nic) met and wed in Sydney. In the second episode, two more couples (Jessika & Mick, Melissa & Dino) met and wed in Byron Bay and Hawkesbury River, both in New South Wales. In the third episode, another two couples (Heidi & Mike, Ning & Mark) met and wed in Byron Bay and Melbourne. In the fifth episode, two more couples (Lauren & Matthew, Elizabeth & Sam) met and wed in Byron Bay and Hawkesbury River. In the sixth episode, the last two couples (Ines & Bronson, Martha & Michael) met and wed in Byron Bay and Melbourne. In the eighteenth episode, two new couples (Susie & Billy, Tamara & Dan) met and wed in Sydney.

The experts had to decide on a controversial request by Dan and Jess who wanted to leave their respective "spouses" but remain in the experiment as a couple. The experts allowed the couple to leave their previous matches and stay in the experiment as a new couple.

Season 7 (2020)

In the first episode, the first two couples (Poppy & Luke, Cathy & Josh) met and wed in Bilpin and Wyong Creek, both in New South Wales. In the second episode, another two couples (Natasha & Mikey, Amanda & Tash) met and wed in Stanwell Tops and Melbourne. In the third episode, another two couples (Hayley & David, Vanessa & Chris) met and wed in Melbourne and Sydney. In the fifth episode, two more couples (Connie & Jonethen, Aleks & Ivan) met and wed in Melbourne and Sydney. In the sixth episode, the last two couples (Mishel & Steve, Stacey & Michael) met and wed in Melbourne. In the eighteenth episode, two new couples (Elizabeth & Seb, KC & Drew) met and wed in Sydney and Central Coast.

Grand Reunion special (2021)
After Season 8 was delayed by three weeks due to a delayed Australian Open, the Nine Network commissioned a two part reunion special to fill the programming gap. Part 1 centered around a dinner party, whereas Part 2 focused on experts John Aiken and Mel Schilling catching up with each participant, where they reflected on their lives following their time in the experiment.

Part 1 aired on 31 January 2021. Part 2 was scheduled to air on 7 February 2021, however was brought forward to 1 February 2021, as counter-programming to the Seven Network's premiere of Holey Moley.

Participants

Season 8 (2021)

In the first episode, two couples (Melissa & Bryce, Rebecca & Jake) met and wed in Richmond and Hunter Valley, both in New South Wales. In the second episode, three more couples (Samantha & Cameron, Booka & Brett, Coco & Sam) met and wed in Sydney and Hunter Valley. In the third episode, another two couples (Alana & Jason, Joanne & James) met and wed in Sydney and Vaucluse. In the fifth episode, two more couples (Belinda & Patrick, Beth & Russell) met and wed in the Hunter Valley and Sydney. In the fourteenth episode, an additional two couples (Kerry & Johnny, Georgia & Liam) met and wed in Richmond and Helensburgh, both in New South Wales. In the fifteenth episode, the final couple Jaimie & Chris met and wed in Sydney.

Season 9 (2022)

In the first episode, two couples (Selin & Anthony, Tamara & Brent) met and wed in Richmond and Sydney. In the second episode, two more couples (Domenica & Jack, Ella & Mitch) met and wed in Helensburgh and Sydney. In the third episode, another two couples (Holly & Andrew, Selina & Cody) met and wed in Sydney and Cattai, New South Wales. In the fifth episode two more couples (Olivia & Jackson, Samantha & Al) met and wed in Sydney. In the fourteenth episode, an additional two couples (Kate & Matt, Carolina & Dion) met and wed in Sydney and Oatlands, New South Wales. In the fifteenth episode, the final couple Jessica & Daniel met and wed in Richmond, New South Wales.

Season 10 (2023)

In the first episode, two couples (Lyndall & Cameron, Bronte & Harrison) met and wed in Byron Bay and Sydney. In the second episode, another two couples (Sandy & Dan, Claire & Jesse) met and wed in Sydney. In the third episode, two more couples (Tahnee & Ollie, Janelle & Adam) met and wed in Sydney and Byron Bay. In the fourth episode, another two couples (Caitlin & Shannon, Alyssa & Duncan) met and wed on the Gold Coast and in Byron Bay. In the fifth episode two more couples (Melissa & Josh, Melinda & Layton) met and wed in Sydney. In the fourteenth episode, the final two couples (Tayla & Hugo, Evelyn & Rupert) met and wed in Sydney.

Viewership

Season ratings

Season 1 (2015)

Season 2 (2016)

Season 3 (2016)

Grand Reunion special (2021)

Controversy and legality
Before the first season went to air, an online petition calling for the series to be axed attracted over 15,000 signatures.

Contestants have also criticised the show, such as second season participant Simone Lee Brennan described the program as "never [being] portrayed to its full authenticity," suggesting the man she had been paired with, Xavier Forsberg, had been recruited by producers and was seeking a sports-presenting role rather than a relationship.

At the show's commitment ceremonies, each person writes "leave" or "stay", and participants can only leave the "marriage" if both they and their "spouse" write "leave". This has been criticised as sending "the worst possible message" to people who may be in a toxic relationship.

Some of the contestants of the show have also spoken out against the program claiming it to be fake, including Dean Wells from Season 5 Other former contestants have been abused in the street, received death threats online, attempted suicide, or been taken to a psychiatric hospital.

International

Broadcasters
In The Netherlands the show is called "Married at First Sight" and is broadcast at primetime on RTL 4.

In Belgium the show is broadcast as Blind getrouwd - Australië and runs every weekday on the Flemish channel VTM2.

In Spain, the show is broadcast as Casados a ciegas and runs every weekday from 6:15 pm for three hours each day on TEN.

In the United Kingdom, in 2020, E4 aired the fourth series (2017), following this the fifth series (2018) was aired and then in early 2021, the sixth series (2019) was broadcast on the channel. By 2021 the series had become a hit with British audiences, earning a number of celebrity fans that included Sam Smith, Michael Ball, and Duncan James.

In New Zealand, the show is broadcast on Three and screens four nights per week.

In the United States, the show is broadcast on cable network Lifetime on Wednesdays and Thursdays at 9pm ET/PT.

References

External links
Official Website (alternative link)

 
Nine Network original programming
2015 Australian television series debuts
2010s Australian reality television series
Australian dating and relationship reality television series
Australian television series based on non-Australian television series
English-language television shows
Wedding television shows
Television series by Endemol Australia
Television shows filmed in Australia
2020s Australian reality television series